Lodhran–Raiwind Branch Line is one of several branch lines in Pakistan, operated and maintained by Pakistan Railways. The line begins from Lodhran Junction station and ends at Raiwind Junction station. There are 22 railway stations from Lodhran Junction to Raiwind Junction.

History
The rail line was originally completed as the Kasur–Lodhran Railway in 1909 by the Southern Punjab Railway as part of the Sutlej Valley Railway irrigation project. The line linked Kasur to Lodhran, where it connected to the North Western State Railway mainline to Karachi. However owing to World War I, financial stringency stagnated developments of the railways. In order to meet the necessities of the military authorities, this rail line (along with the Hyderabad–Badin Railway) was dismantled in 1917 and subsequently rebuilt in 1922.

Stations

See also
Karachi–Peshawar Railway Line
Railway Lines in Pakistan

References

Railway stations on Lodhran–Raiwind Line
5 ft 6 in gauge railways in Pakistan